The 2016–17 Saint Mary's Gaels women's basketball team represented Saint Mary's College of California in the 2016–17 NCAA Division I women's basketball season. The Gales, led by eleventh year head coach Paul Thomas, played their home games at the McKeon Pavilion and were members of the West Coast Conference. They finished the season 20–13, 13–5 in WCC play to finish in a tie for second place. They advanced to the championship game of the WCC women's tournament where they lost to Gonzaga. They received an at-large bid to the WNIT where they lost to Colorado State in the first round.

Roster

Schedule and results

|-
!colspan=9 style="background:#06315B; color:#D80024;"| Non-conference regular season

|-
!colspan=9 style="background:#06315B; color:#D80024;"| WCC regular season

|-
!colspan=9 style="background:#06315B; color:#D80024;"| WCC Women's Tournament

|-
!colspan=9 style="background:#06315B;"| Women's National Invitation Tournament

See also
 2016–17 Saint Mary's Gaels men's basketball team

References

Saint Mary's Gaels women's basketball seasons
Saint Mary's
Saint Mary's
Saint Mary's
2017 Women's National Invitation Tournament participants